Saruk may refer to:
 Saruk, Chaharmahal and Bakhtiari